SuckSeed ( SuckSeed: Huay Khan Thep) is a 2011 Thai comedy film. Directed by first-time feature director Chayanop Boonprakob, this film stars teenage actors Jirayu Laongmanee, Pachara Chirathivat, Thawat Pornrattanaprasert, and Nattasha Nauljam. The film follows the antics of three secondary school students who form a rock band to impress girls. Despite their efforts, their band plays poorly and the members regularly end up as losers.

Based in part on Chayanop's thesis project short film about a band of young members who perform badly but insist on trying, the film features themes of teenage dreams, friendship, romance, and their expression through music, and includes pieces of popular rock songs interspersed within the narrative as well as cameos by several well-known musicians.

SuckSeed was released in the Thai box office on 17 March 2011. It grossed a total of 21.4 million baht on its opening weekend. In total, the film earned US$2,600,673 in the Thai box office.

Cast

Main 

 Pachara Chirathivat as Koong and Kay
 Jirayu La-ongmanee as Ped
 Nattasha Nauljam as Ern
 Thawat Pornrattanaprasert as Ex

Supporting 

 Tonhon Tantiwetchakun as Ped (young)
 Gunn Junhavat as Tem
 Anchasa Mongkhonsamai as Som
 Adisorn Tresirikasem

References

External links
 
 

2011 films
Thai comedy films
Thai-language films